This article is about communications systems in American Samoa.

Telephone
Main lines in use: 10,400 (2004)
country comparison to the world: 202

Mobile cellular: 2,200 (2004)
country comparison to the world: 210

Telephone system:
domestic: good telex, telegraph, facsimile and cellular telephone services; domestic satellite system with 1 Comsat earth station
international: satellite earth station - 1 Intelsat (Pacific Ocean)
international access code: +1.684 (in the North American Numbering Plan, Area code 684)

Radio
Radio broadcast stations: AM 0, FM 4 commercial, 4 non-commercial, 2 LPFM, shortwave 0 (2005)

Radios:
57,000 (1997)

Television
Television broadcast stations: 4 (2006)
Televisions: 14,000 (1997)

See List of television stations in American Samoa.

Internet
In 2009, American Samoa was connected to the Internet using the American Samoa Hawaii Cable (ASH) undersea communications cable that increased bandwidth from 20 Mbit/s to 1 Gbit/s. The project used a defunct PacRim East cable built in 1993 that previously connected Hawaii with New Zealand. The cable system now connects Samoa to American Samoa and then to Hawaii where it will connect to global submarine networks. In July 2018, the Hawaiki cable was activated with a branch providing a 200Gb/s connection from Pago Pago to Hawaii, New Zealand, Australia, and Oregon.

Situation in 2016
In 2012, American Samoa had the most expensive Internet access service in the U.S. according to Engadget.

Under Governor Togiola Tulafono investment in a fibre optic network to replace aging copper infrastructure across all the islands of American Samoa and the construction in 2015 of a 1.2Gbit/s satellite uplink via O3b Networks which more than doubled available bandwidth to the rest of the world resulted in broadband Internet service becoming more affordable, with the price of the cheapest available residential package decreasing from $75/month to $50/month and download speeds of the base package increasing from 256kbit/s to 768kbit/s. The improved connectivity to the outside world has revived previously stalled hopes that a call center could be opened in American Samoa, boosting the local economy.

Aleki Sene, Sr. Telecommunications Center
The Aleki Sene, Sr. Telecommunications Center in Tafuna is the tallest building in American Samoa (it is 4 stories tall). Construction of the building began in 2009 and ended in 2011. Out of the tallest buildings of each U.S. state and territory, the Aleki Sene, Sr. Telecommunications Center is the shortest.

References

American Samoa
Economy of American Samoa
American Samoan culture
+American Samoa